James G. Van Bramer (born August 19, 1969) is an American politician. A Democrat, who served in the New York City Council and represented the 26th district from 2010 to 2021, which includes Astoria, Long Island City, Sunnyside, and Woodside in Queens. Van Bramer is a progressive who was one of the few members of the City Council to endorse Cynthia Nixon's campaign in the 2018 New York gubernatorial election.

Early life and education 
Van Bramer was born and grew up in the New York City borough of Queens, the son of retired active union members. His father, William Van Bramer, was a lifelong member of Printers' and Pressman's Union Local 2. His mother, Elizabeth, helped support the family by taking a variety of jobs in their neighborhood. She was a member of Local 1893 of the International Brotherhood of Painters.

Van Bramer graduated from William Cullen Bryant High School. In 1994, he graduated from St. Johns University.

Career 
Before joining the City Council, Van Bramer served as the Chief External Affairs Officer of the Queens Public Library. In this capacity, he was the library's link between community members and government. 

He worked as a reporter for Lesbian and Gay New York (now Gay City News) a community newspaper, where he brought attention to the AIDS epidemic and bias/hate crimes. He represents his neighborhood and the 37th Assembly District on the New York State Democratic Committee.

In September 2007, he was named one of City & State's "40 under 40" for being a young influential member of New York City politics. Van Bramer currently lives in Sunnyside Gardens with his husband, Dan Hendrick. They married on July 28, 2012. Van Bramer is one of four openly LGBTQ+ members of the New York City Council, alongside Corey Johnson, Daniel Dromm and Carlos Menchaca.

New York City Council

Van Bramer was first elected to the New York City Council to represent the 26th district on November 3, 2009. He was re-elected in 2013. On January 22, 2014, Van Bramer was chosen to be the New York City Council's Majority Leader, the second-most powerful position in the body. He was also named to serve as co-chair of a budget negotiating team set up by Speaker Melissa Mark-Viverito.

He was elected to a third 4-year term on November 7, 2017 and reappointed to the budget negotiating team by Speaker Corey Johnson. Van Bramer was appointed to chair the Council’s Cultural Affairs, Libraries and International Relations Committee. He has served as chair of this committee throughout his tenure as a council member.

See also 
 LGBT culture in New York City
 List of LGBT people from New York City
 Neighborhoods in Queens

References

External links
 Official website 
 Gazette

1969 births
Living people
American people of Dutch descent
Candidates in the 2021 United States elections
New York City Council members
New York (state) Democrats
American LGBT city council members
LGBT people from New York (state)
People from Queens, New York
St. John's University (New York City) alumni
21st-century American politicians
Gay politicians